Local elections in Edo State will be held on 19 April 2022.

References

See also 

Edo State local elections
April 2022 events in Nigeria
2022 local elections in Nigeria